The Gura Apelor Dam is a rock-fill dam on the river Râul Mare about  southwest of Hațeg in Hunedoara County, Romania. It is fed by the Râul Mare and its tributaries Lăpușnicul Mic and Șes. It is the tallest dam in Romania. Water from the reservoir is piped the long distance from the dam to the power station. Construction on the dam began in 1975 and the power station was operational in 1986. In 2012 the dam's reservoir was drained for repairs. It is expected to be impounded again in 2014.

References

External links

Dams in Romania
Rock-filled dams
Dams completed in 1986
Buildings and structures in Hunedoara County
Energy infrastructure completed in 1986
Hydroelectric power stations in Romania
Underground power stations
1986 establishments in Romania